Xu Lili (born February 18, 1988) is a Chinese judoka from Binzhou, Shandong who made it to the finals in the 2012 Summer Olympics in the category Women's 63 kg, winning a silver medal. She is the younger sister of Xu Yuhua, also a judoka.

References

External links
 
 
 

Living people
1988 births
Judoka at the 2012 Summer Olympics
Olympic medalists in judo
Olympic judoka of China
Olympic silver medalists for China
Sportspeople from Shandong
People from Binzhou
Medalists at the 2012 Summer Olympics
Chinese female judoka
20th-century Chinese women
21st-century Chinese women